Crematogaster brasiliensis is a species of ant in tribe Crematogastrini. It was described by Mayr in 1878.

References

brasiliensis
Insects described in 1878